Qaleh Now (also Romanized as Qal‘eh Now and Qal‘eh-ye Now) is a village in Forg Rural District, Forg District, Darab County, Fars Province, Iran. At the 2006 census, its population was 1,631, in 343 families.

References 

Populated places in Darab County